Tetraglenes bacillarius is a species of beetle in the family Cerambycidae. It was described by Lameere in 1893.

References

Agapanthiini
Beetles described in 1893